Carlson Buttress is a rock buttress to the northwest of Worcester Summit, rising to about  on the north side of Jaeger Table, Dufek Massif, in the Pensacola Mountains. It was named by the Advisory Committee on Antarctic Names in 1979 for Christine Carlson, United States Geological Survey geologist who worked in the Dufek Massif area, summer 1976–77.

References
 

Ridges of Queen Elizabeth Land